The Gagnon River is a tributary of the Upper Channel which flows into Lake Saint-Paul (which flows into the St. Lawrence River via the Godefroy River).

The "Gagnon River" flows through the town of Bécancour, in the Bécancour Regional County Municipality, in the administrative region of Centre-du-Québec, in Quebec, in Canada.

Geography 

The main hydrographic slopes of the Gagnon River are:
 north side: Bécancour River, St. Lawrence River;
 east side: Blanche River, Bécancour River;
 south side: Blanche River;
 west side: Chenal d'en Haut, Judith River, St. Lawrence River.

The Gagnon river has its source in an agricultural area of the town of Bécancour, south of the Bécancour River and north of the hamlet of Précieux-Sang. The Gagnon River receives the waters of the "East Arm of the Gagnon River" and the "West Arm of the Gagnon River".

On its course, the river crosses the southwestern part of the territory Wolinak.

The Gagnon river empties on the west bank of the "Chenal d'en Haut".

Toponymy 
The toponym "rivière Gagnon" was made official on August 17, 1978, at Commission de toponymie du Québec.

See also 
 List of rivers of Quebec

References

External links 

 

Rivers of Centre-du-Québec
Arthabaska Regional County Municipality